Roy Askevold (1 July 1935 – 30 March 2005) was a Norwegian amateur boxer who competed in the 1960 Summer Olympics.

He was born and died in Oslo, and represented the sports club SK av 1909. He finished seventeenth in the light-middleweight division in the boxing at the 1960 Summer Olympics.

References

1935 births
2005 deaths
Sportspeople from Oslo
Light-middleweight boxers
Boxers at the 1960 Summer Olympics
Olympic boxers of Norway
Norwegian male boxers
20th-century Norwegian people